Eulipotyphla (which means "truly fat and blind") is an order of mammals suggested by molecular methods of phylogenetic reconstruction, which includes the laurasiatherian members of the now-invalid polyphyletic order Lipotyphla, but not the afrotherian members (tenrecs, golden moles, and otter shrews, now in their own order Afrosoricida).

Eulipotyphla comprises the hedgehogs and gymnures (family Erinaceidae, formerly also the order Erinaceomorpha), solenodons (family Solenodontidae), the desmans, moles, and shrew-like moles (family Talpidae) and true shrews (family Soricidae). True shrews, talpids and solenodons were formerly grouped in Soricomorpha; however, Soricomorpha has been found to be paraphyletic, since erinaceids are the sister group of shrews.

As part of the superorder Laurasiatheria, they are related to Carnivora (e.g. cats, dogs, bears), Pholidota (pangolins), Chiroptera (bats), Perissodactyla (equids) and Artiodactyla (e.g. bovids, deers).

Classification 

 Order Eulipotyphla (= 'Lipotyphla' - Afrosoricida = 'Erinaceomorpha' + 'Soricomorpha')
 Family Erinaceidae
 Subfamily Erinaceinae: hedgehogs
 Subfamily Galericinae: gymnures or moonrats
 Family Soricidae
 Subfamily Crocidurinae: white-toothed shrews
 Subfamily Soricinae: red-toothed shrews
 Subfamily Myosoricinae: African white-toothed shrews
 Family Talpidae
 Subfamily Talpinae: Old World moles and desmans
 Subfamily Scalopinae: New World moles
 Subfamily Uropsilinae: shrew-like moles
 Family Solenodontidae: solenodons
† Family Nesophontidae: extinct West Indian shrews
† Family Amphilemuridae
† Family Nyctitheriidae
† Family Plesiosoricidae
Family-level cladogram of modern eulipotyphlan relationships, following Roca et al. and Brace et al.:

The upper and lower basal subclades within the tree are the suborders Solenodonota and Erinaceota, respectively. These two branches are estimated to have split ~72-74 million years (Ma) ago. The Nesophontidae and Solenodontidae are thought to have separated roughly 57 Ma ago. Split times for talpids vs. soricids plus erinaceids, and for soricids vs. erinaceids, have been estimated at around 69 Ma and 64 Ma ago, respectively.

Notes

References

 
Mammal orders
Extant Paleocene first appearances